Velugodu is a village and a mandal in Nandyal district, Andhra Pradesh, India.

Geography
Velugodu is known for the Telugu Ganga reservoir, near Nallamala Forest. There are temples in the forest, including Yaganandam, Gundla Brammeswaram, and Rudrakodu. The village is situated between Nandyal and Atmakur, on the banks of the Galeru River, which is a tributary of the Penna River. The rivers are connected to the Srisailam Dam reservoir in the Krishna River basin through a deep cut feeder canal from the Pothireddypadu Reservoir.

References 

Villages in Nandyal district
Mandals in Nandyal district